The HAMDY mine is an Egyptian directional fragmentation mine based on the US Claymore mine and produced by the Maasara Company. The mine consists of a rectangular sand colored plastic main body with a convex face, inside which is a layer of approximately 700 steel fragments embedded in a main charge of cast explosive. The mine is supported by two sets of scissor type legs. On the top of the mine is a crude peep sight and two detonator wells, designed to accept electrical command detonators or MUV style trip fuzes. When triggered the mine scatters fragments in an arc of 60 degrees to a range of 50 meters and a height of approximately two meters.

The mine has been used in Afghanistan and Angola.

References
 Jane's Mines and Mine Clearance 2005-2006
 Brassey's Essential Guide To Anti-Personnel Landmines, Eddie Banks
 

Anti-personnel mines
Weapons of Egypt